Acrobatic Tenement is the debut studio album by American post-hardcore band At the Drive-In, released on February 18, 1997, on Flipside. The album, along with In/Casino/Out and Relationship of Command, was reissued by Fearless Records in 2004, and was re-released again in 2013.

Only one of the album's tracks made it to the 2005 compilation album, This Station Is Non-Operational, with "Initiation" appearing as a live BBC recording.

Background and recording
The album was initially released on August 18, 1996, exclusively on CD format through the Los Angeles independent record label/fanzine Flipside after a few of the label's staff members were impressed by the band's performance in a small Los Angeles club. The record was recorded in Los Angeles for only $600 after concluding a U.S. tour.  The album has been noted for its lack of distortion, which is due to the fact that guitarist Jim Ward believed his recordings wouldn't be used for the final master. Reflecting upon the aftermath of recording Acrobatic Tenement, vocalist Cedric Bixler stated in 2013: "Before [the album's release], the band had broken up. We did a U.S. tour and we decided to split up. I always needed Jim to be there, but he'd had a falling out with Omar. We'd made a bunch of dumb moves at the time — kicked the drummer [Ryan Sawyer] who was on the record out, and then the other guitar player [Adam Amparan] — but then Tony and Paul came and played. Omar switched to guitar at the time, because he played bass on that album, so when we played live, it was a lot different."

Much of the album, particularly the track "Ebroglio," was inspired by the life and suicide of Julio Venegas, a friend of the band.  Venegas later became the inspiration of The Mars Volta's 2003 album De-Loused in the Comatorium.

Track listing

Personnel 
Cedric Bixler – Lead vocals
Jim Ward – Guitar, back-up vocals
Adam Amparan – Guitar
Omar Rodríguez – Bass
Ryan Sawyer – Drums

References

1996 debut albums
At the Drive-In albums